Luca Finn Horn (born 19 December 1998) is a German professional footballer who plays as a left midfielder for Hansa Rostock II.

Career
In September 2020 Horn moved to 3. Liga club FC Hansa Rostock.

In June 2021, he signed for FSV Zwickau on a season-long loan.

References

External links
 
 
 

1998 births
Living people
People from Wilhelmshaven
Footballers from Lower Saxony
German footballers
Association football midfielders
Association football fullbacks
VfL Wolfsburg players
FC Hansa Rostock players
FSV Zwickau players
Bundesliga players
3. Liga players
Regionalliga players